Cetadiol, also known as androst-5-ene-3β,16α-diol, is a drug described as a "steroid tranquilizer" which was briefly investigated as a treatment for alcoholism in the 1950s. It is an androstane steroid and analogue of 5-androstenediol (androst-5-ene-3β,17β-diol) and 16α-hydroxy-DHEA (androst-5-ene-3β,16α-diol-17-one), but showed no androgenic or myotrophic activity in animal bioassays. The drug was reported in 1956 and studied until 1958.

Chemistry

See also
 Androstadienol (androsta-5,16-dien-3β-ol)
 Androstenol (5α-androst-16-en-3α-ol)
 4-Androstadienol (PH94B; Aloradine)
 Cyclopregnol

References

Abandoned drugs
Alcohol abuse
Androstanes
Anxiolytics
Diols
Drug rehabilitation
Drugs with unknown mechanisms of action